Marcinkowice may refer to the following places in Poland:
Marcinkowice, Lower Silesian Voivodeship (south-west Poland)
Marcinkowice, Miechów County in Lesser Poland Voivodeship (south Poland)
Marcinkowice, Nowy Sącz County in Lesser Poland Voivodeship (south Poland)
Marcinkowice, Kazimierza County in Świętokrzyskie Voivodeship (south-central Poland)
Marcinkowice, Opatów County in Świętokrzyskie Voivodeship (south-central Poland)
Marcinkowice, Tarnów County in Lesser Poland Voivodeship (south Poland)
Marcinkowice, West Pomeranian Voivodeship (north-west Poland)